Vila Real is the capital and largest city of the Vila Real District, in the North region, Portugal. It is also the seat of the Douro intermunicipal community and of the Trás-os-Montes e Alto Douro historical province.

The city is located in a plateau 450 m (1,510 ft) high, over the promontory formed by the gorges of the Corgo and Cabril rivers, where the oldest part of town (Vila Velha) is located, framed by the escarpments of the Corgo gorge. The Alvão and Marão mountains overlook the town on the northwest and southwest side, respectively, rising up to 1,400 m (4,600 ft). With over seven hundred years of existence, the city was once known as the "royal court of Trás-os-Montes" due to the high number of manors bearing coats of arms and family crests, attesting the presence of noble figures that established in the city by influence of the Marquis of Vila Real, the most powerful aristocratic house in Portugal, during the 16th and 17th centuries, after the Dukes of Braganza and the Dukes of Aveiro. Many of these family crests are still visible today in the manors spread throughout the old city and in the Carreira Garden.

Vila Real was ranked seventh in the list of Portugal's most livable cities in the survey of living conditions published by the Portuguese newspaper Expresso in 2007.

History
The region shows traces of inhabitation during the paleolithic era, while the settlement of Panóias and the Panóias Sanctuary had a Roman presence. However, with the barbaric and Muslim invasions there was a gradual depopulation.

At the end of the 11th century, in 1096, Henry, Count of Portugal wrote a foral, a royal document whose purpose was to establish and regulate a town, establishing Constantim de Panóias as a way to repopulate the region. In 1272, as a new incentive to repopulation, King Afonso III of Portugal wrote another unsuccessful foral to establish Vila Real de Panóias. Only in 1289, the third foral written by King Denis of Portugal was successful in establishing Vila Real de Panóias, whose name, meaning Royal Town, is a testimony to its origin by royal decree.

Vila Real's privileged location at the crossroad between the Porto-Bragança and Viseu-Chaves roads allowed for a sustained growth over the centuries. Starting from the 17th century, the House of Vila Real attracted the nobility to an extent that during that time the city housed more members of the royal family than any other settlement in Portugal except the capital in Lisbon, and family coats of arms remain above old houses and manors, some of which are still occupied by those families. Vineyards were introduced to the municipality in 1764, growing red, white and rosé wines for export. Despite its royal presence, Vila Real remained with the status of town until the increase in population in the 19th century, which led to it gaining the status of capital of the Vila Real District and the historic province of Trás-os-Montes e Alto Douro. The Roman Catholic Diocese of Vila Real was created in 1922 from the dioceses of Bragança-Miranda, Braga and  Lamego and Vila Real finally gained city status under the Portuguese Republic in 1925.

It was the fourth Portuguese city to have public supply of electricity, but it was the first to produce hydroelectric power, from 1894 to 1926 in the Hydroelectric Power Plant of Biel, located near the Corgo River, named after Karl Emil Biel.

The city experienced a great development with the establishment of the University of Trás-os-Montes and Alto Douro in 1986, succeeding the Polytechnic Institute of Vila Real created in 1973, contributing to an increase and revitalization of the population. In 2017 there were 6 651 students enrolled in higher education.

In the last couple of years, several cultural facilities were built, such as the Vila Real Theater, the Vila Velha Museum, the Sound and Image Museum, the Regional Conservatory of Music and the transfer of the Dr. Júlio Teixeira Public Library and Municipal Archive to new buildings, bringing some dynamism and progress to the city. Various areas of the city have also been rehabilitated, such as the Centro Histórico, the Vila Velha and traditional typical neighbourhoods like Bairro dos Ferreiros and Bairro S. Vicente de Paulo. The area surrounding the Corgo River has also been rehabilitated, becoming the Corgo Park, the Forest Park and the Codessais Recreational Complex, including cultural components as the Vila Real Science Center and the Urban Ecology Agency.

Nowadays the city experiences a phase of growing industrial and commercial development, aimed at health, education and tourism, presenting itself as an attractive place for foreign investment, being internationally known by the Circuito Internacional de Vila Real, the street circuit used for the FIA WTCR Race of Portugal, one of the events of the World Touring Car Cup.

Coat of arms

The coat of arms of Vila Real - a sword embedded in a wreath of zambujeiro (wild olive tree) and the slogan Aleu - is derived from the decorative motif of the tomb of Pedro de Menezes, 1st Count of Vila Real, found in the Igreja da Graça in Santarém. 'Aleu' or 'aleo' is an old Portuguese term for a 'gaming stick' (as used in hockey or shuffleboard). It refers to a famous episode concerning Pedro de Menezes from shortly after the Conquest of Ceuta on September 2, 1415 (commemorated on Ceuta Day). Pedro de Menezes was engaged in an outdoor game in the king's presence when a messenger arrived reporting an imminent Moroccan attack on Portuguese-held Ceuta.  Menezes is said to have raised his gaming stick (aleo) and told the king that "with that stick alone" he could defend Ceuta from all the power of Morocco. Similar design can be seen on the coat of arms of Alcoutim, where Pedro's descendants were made Count's of Alcoutim.

Population
	
(Observation: Number of resident inhabitants, that is, that had their official residency in Vila Real at the time of the census.)	
	
	
(Observation: From 1900 to 1950 the data refers to the de facto population, that was present in Vila Real at the time of the census.)

Climate
Vila Real has a Mediterranean climate (Köppen: Csb/Csa) with warm to hot dry summers and cool wet winters.
 
Located in a promontory formed by the gorges of the Corgo and Cabril rivers, Vila Real sits at  altitude.

Due to the geographical location, its climate is a mix between Mediterranean and oceanic, with some continental influences. Winters are long, with negative temperatures and frequent frosts. Snowfall usually occurs once or twice each year.

Civil parishes
Vila Real's municipality consists of 20 freguesias or civil parishes, which are not all coexistent with the ecclesiastical parishes or paróquias. The civil parish Vila Real (Nossa Senhora da Conceição, São Pedro e São Dinis) is officially the city of Vila Real.

Administratively, the municipality is divided into 20 civil parishes (freguesias): 

 Abaças
 Adoufe e Vilarinho de Samardã
 Andrães
 Arroios
 Borbela e Lamas de Olo
 Campeã
 Constantim e Vale de Nogueiras
 Folhadela
 Guiães
 Lordelo
 Mateus
 Mondrões
 Mouçós e Lamares
 Nogueira e Ermida
 Parada de Cunhos
 Pena, Quintã e Vila Cova
 São Tomé do Castelo e Justes
 Torgueda
 Vila Marim
 Vila Real (Nossa Senhora da Conceição, São Pedro e São Dinis)

Infrastructure

Museums and cultural facilities
 Archaeology and Numismatic Museum
 Vila Velha Museum
 Professor Fernando Real Geology Museum at the University of Trás-os-Montes and Alto Douro
 Ethnographic Museum
 Sound and Image Museum
 Alvão Natural Park Information and Interpretation Center 
 Panoias Sanctuary Interpretation Center
 Vila Real Science Center
 Urban Ecology Agency
 Dr. Júlio Teixeira Public Library
 Vila Real Theater
 Casa de Mateus Foundation
 Municipal Archive
 Vila-Realense Literary Guild

Sports 
 Codessais Recreational Complex
 Monte da Forca Sports Complex
 UTAD Sports Complex
 Abambres Sports Complex
 Engenheiro Francisco Campos Sports Complex
 Calvário Football Pitch
 Cruzeiro Stadium (Constantim)
 D. Francisco de Sousa Albuquerque Football Pitch (Mateus)
 Flores Tennis Court
 UTAD Tennis Courts
 Vila Real Tennis Club
 Corgo Park Multi Sport
 Forest Park Multi Sport
 Vila Real Sports Center
 Araucária Sports Center
 Diogo Cão Sports Center
 UTAD Sports Center
 Vila Real AMF Kartdrome
 Monte da Forca Kartdrome
 Municipal Covered Swimming Pools
 Codessais Swimming Pools
 NaturWaterPark - Douro Amusement Park
 Vila Real Rocodrome - Climbing Walls
 Walking and Running Center
 Vila Real Automobile Club
 Sport Club Vila Real is the city's football club, founded in 1920. It has played in the Portuguese third and fourth tiers, currently competing in the fourth, the Terceira Divisao.

Health 
 Nuno Grande community health center (USF)
 Corgo community health center (USF)
 Fénix community health center (USF)
 Nova de Mateus community health center (USF)
 Mateus Personalized Health Care Unit (UCSP)
 Mateus UCSP - Abaças Unit
 Mateus UCSP - Torgueda Unit
 Mateus UCSP - Campeã Unit
 Mateus UCSP - Sanguinhedo Unit
 Integrated Continued Care Unit - Vila Real Santa Casa da Misericórdia
 St. Peter Hospital, part of the Hospital Center of Trás-os-Montes e Alto Douro (CHTMAD)
 Hospital da Luz - Vila Real (Private)
 Trofa Saúde - Hospital Vila Real (Private)

Nature 
 UTAD Botanical Garden
 Forest Park
 Corgo Park
 Alvão Natural Park
 Alvão/Marão Site of Community Importance (Natura 2000 Network)
 Vila Real Campsite
 Mateus Palace Gardens
 Carreira Garden
 Alto Douro Wine Region, a UNESCO World Heritage Site

Education 
University of Trás-os-Montes and Alto Douro
Agostinho Roseta Technical School
Nervir Technical School
Camilo Castelo Branco Secondary School
São Pedro Secondary School
Morgado de Mateus Secondary School
Diogo Cão Lower Secondary School
Monsenhor Jerónimo do Amaral Lower Secondary School
João Paulo II Private School
São José Private School
S. Vicente de Paulo Primary School
Corgo Primary School
Árvores Primary School
Flores Primary School
Araucária Primary School
Douro Primary School
Mouçós Primary School
Lordelo Primary School
Agarez Primary School
Arrabães Primary School
Mondrões Primary School
Parada de Cunhos Primary School
Prado Primary School
Campeã Primary School
Vila Marim Primary School
Vilarinho da Samardã Primary School

Others 

 Nosso Shopping Center
 Constantim Industrial Park
 Regia Douro Park - Science and Technology Park

Main sights
thumb|right|200px|Cathedral of Vila Real
thumb|right|200px|16th-century pillory of Vila Real 
 Capela da Misericórdia
 Capela de São Brás e o túmulo de Teixeira de Macedo
 Capela do Espírito Santo ou Capela do Bom Jesus do Hospital
 Diogo Cão's house
 Carvalho Araújo's house
 Brocas' house
 Marqueses's house de Vila Real
 Cathedral of Vila Real
 St. Peter's church
 Bom Jesus do Calvário church
 Clérigos's church or "Capela Nova"
 Pelourinho de Vila Real

Outside the city centre
 Alvão Natural Park
 Mateus Palace
 Quintela's tower
 Mamoas de Justes
 Mão do Homem, in Adoufe
 Necrópole de S. Miguel da Pena
 Santuário de Panóias, in Vale de Nogueiras

Transportation

Highways
 A24 - Connects Chaves (frontier with Galiza, Spain), to the North, and Viseu, to the South.
 A7 - Indirect connection to Minho (Braga, Guimarães, etc.), from Vila Pouca de Aguiar, via A24.
 A4 - Main Road that connects Porto, to the West, and Bragança, Northeast and the frontier with Castilla y Leon, Spain.

Airfield
Vila Real airfield (VRL) - Located 4 km from city centre, near the Industrial Zone, in the Folhadela parish.
Has a paved runway with 950×30 m.
A scheduled airline service operated by Aero VIP serves some domestic destinations.

Railway

The Corgo line was a metre gauge railway that connected the city to Regua, 25 km south, in the Douro valley. It closed for renovation in 2009, but due to spending cuts by the Portuguese Government the closure has become permanent. It followed the Corgo river valley and offered splendid views to the characteristic vineyards clinging on to almost vertical. Until 1990 the Corgo line also continued north to Chaves.

Urban bus
The city bus system in Vila Real is run by Corgobus; there are 5 lines and about 1.35 million people in 2008 were transported.

Main distances
 Chaves  - 68 km
 Viseu  - 90 km
 Porto  - 97 km
 Francisco Sá Carneiro Airport (OPO)  - 100 km
 Braga  - 100 km
 Bragança  - 120 km
 Lisboa  - 411 km
 Madrid  - 520 km
 Faro  - 613 km

Twin towns — sister cities
Vila Real is twinned with:

 Osnabrück, Germany
 Ourense, Spain
 Grasse, France
 Mende, France
 Espinho, Portugal

Famous citizens

 Diogo Cão (ca.1452-ca.1486) an explorer and a notable navigator of the Age of Discovery.
 Luís Vaz Pereira Pinto Guedes (1770-1841) a brigadier on the absolutist side in Portugal's Liberal Wars & 2nd Viscount of Montalegre.
 António Lopes Mendes (1835–1894) an explorer and agronomist in Brazil and India & an illustrator and cartographer. 
 Gen. José Augusto Alves Roçadas (1865–1926) colonial governor in Angola and Macau
 Carvalho Araújo (1881–1918) a Portuguese Navy officer, colonial administrator and politician.
 Luísa Dacosta (1927-2015) a prize-winning Portuguese writer.
 Francisco Seixas da Costa (born 1948) a retired Portuguese diplomat.

Sport 

 Paulo Alves (born 1969) footballer with 401 club caps and 13 for Portugal
 Simão Sabrosa (born 1979) footballer with 500 club caps and 85 for Portugal
 Vítor Murta (born 1979) a Portuguese former football goalkeeper with 339 club caps.
 Norberto Mourão (born 1980) a paracanoeist, bronze medallist at the 2020 Summer Paralympics.
 Jaime Linares (born 1982) an Angolan footballer with over 300 club caps and 3 for Angola
 Jorge Rodrigues (born 1982) a retired footballer with over 350 club caps.
 André Pires (born 1989) a Portuguese motorcycle racer.
 Ana Sofia Nóbrega (born 1990) Portuguese-born Angolan swimmer, completed at the 2016 Summer Olympics

Gallery

References

External links

Municipality official website
University of Trás-os-Montes e Alto Douro
Vila Real Theatre
Infantry Regiment no. 13
Photos from Vila Real
AeroVIP site (Flights Bragança - Vila Real - Lisboa)

Cities in Portugal
Municipalities of Vila Real District